Below is a list of squads used in the 1980 African Cup of Nations.

Group A

Côte d'Ivoire
Coach: Gérard Gabo and  José D'Amico
|

Egypt
Coach: Abdel Monem El-Hajj
|

Nigeria
Coach:  Otto Glória

Tanzania
Coach:  Slawomir Wolk
|

Group B

Algeria
Coach:  Zdravko Rajkov and Mahieddine Khalef

Ghana
Coach: Fred Osam-Duodu

Guinea
Coach: Diélimory Diabaté
|

Morocco
Coach: Mohamed Hamidouche and Mohamed Jabrane
|

External links
FIFA

Africa Cup of Nations squads
1980 African Cup of Nations